The 2015 Intrust Super Cup was the PNG Hunters second season in the Queensland Cup.

Season summary

For their second campaign the squad changed very little. The major losses were Garry Lo, David Loko and Joe Bruno who joined the coaching staff following his retirement. The main gains being Kato Ottio and Nickson Borana. The season began with the Hunters losing 3 of their opening 6 fixtures, but they then went on an unbeaten run of 17 games to the end of the regular season securing second place in the league, missing out on top spot by 1 point. Ipswich Jets ended their season in the preliminary final. Off the field Head Coach Michael Marum was voted coach of the year, and during the season CEO Brad Tassell was forced to resign.

2015 squad

Squad movement

Gains

Losses

References

2015 in Papua New Guinea rugby league
2015 in rugby league by club
Papua New Guinea Hunters